Chillicothe Commercial Historic District is a national historic district located at Chillicothe, Livingston County, Missouri.   The district encompasses 24 contributing buildings in the central business district and surrounding residential area of Chillicothe. It developed between about 1889 and 1950, and includes representative examples of Queen Anne, Italianate, Beaux Arts, Mission Revival, and Art Deco style architecture. Notable buildings include the Scruby Brothers Building (1893), S. A. Stone Building (c. 1894), Dairy Creme Building (c. 1950), Strand Coffee Shop Building (1936), Strand Hotel and Garage (1925), Norman & Jarvis Funeral Home Building (c. 1916), Empire Theatre (1916), Chillicothe Post Office/Federal Building (1916), Grace & Simpson Apartments (1916), and Loomis Building/Chillicothe Post Office (1898).

It was listed on the National Register of Historic Places in 2002.

References

Historic districts on the National Register of Historic Places in Missouri
Queen Anne architecture in Missouri
Italianate architecture in Missouri
Mission Revival architecture in Missouri
Beaux-Arts architecture in Missouri
Art Deco architecture in Missouri
Buildings and structures in Livingston County, Missouri
National Register of Historic Places in Livingston County, Missouri